Giovanni Andrea Donducci (1575–1655), also known as Mastelletta, was an Italian Baroque painter of the Bolognese School (painting). His father was a maker of vats (mastelli). Born in Bologna, he trained in the Carracci Academy degli Incamminati at about the time when Domenichino, Lucio Massari, and perhaps Albani were there.

He belongs to the generation of Carracci- inspired or trained painters comprised by Giacomo Cavedone (1577–1660); Alessandro Tiarini (1577–1668), Lucio Massari, Lionello Spada (1576=1622), and Lorenzo Garbieri.  Art biographer Malvasia claims he befriended the Genoese Agostino Tassi while in Rome.

Between 1613-1614, he contributed to the decoration of the chapel of Saint Dominic in the Basilica of San Domenico in Bologna. On the right side of the chapel The Miracle of the Forty Drowned (1613) and on the left side the canvas Resurrection of the young Napoleone Orsini (1614). He also frescoed the patron saints of Bologna on the pendentives of the dome: San Floriano, St. Francis, San Procolo and San Petronio.

Malvasia describes him by the late 1620s as increasingly neurotic and reclusive: “an enemy of his friends, suspicious of everyone, hating himself, in other words". His figures have an almost phantasmagoric Alessandro Magnasco-like fervor, not characteristic of Bolognese classicism. He is also painted elaborate landscapes to his paintings, likely an influence of Scarsellino's and/or Niccolò dell'Abbate's works.

Anthology of Works
Jesus served by Angels(1615–17)
Charity of a Saint

References

1575 births
1655 deaths
16th-century Italian painters
Italian male painters
17th-century Italian painters
Painters from Bologna
Italian Baroque painters